Rachel Feldman is an American director of film and television and screenwriter of television films.

Life and career
Born in New York City, New York, Feldman began her career as a child actor performing extensively in commercials and television series.

Her credits as a television director include: ((The Rookie)), ((Criminal Minds)), ((Blue Bloods)), and some beloved shows like Doogie Howser, M.D., The Commish, Dr. Quinn, Medicine Woman, Picket Fences, Sisters,Lizzie McGuire, at the start of her career. She will be directing the feature, ((Lilly)) starring Patricia Clarkson 2022.

She has written and directed several features including:  Lilly  (2023), Post Modern Romance (1993), She's No Angel (2001) starring Tracey Gold, Recipe for a Perfect Christmas (2005) starring Christine Baranski and Love Notes (2007) starring Laura Leighton.

Personal life and education
Feldman is married to artisan contractor and colorist Carl Tillmanns; together they have two children, Nora and Leon. They are both alumni of Sarah Lawrence College, where they first met.

Feldman also has a Master of Fine Arts degree from New York University and has taught classes in directing and screenwriting at the USC School of Cinematic Arts.

Feldman is also an activist for women behind the camera, who can be seen in the Geena Davis produced documentary This Changes Everything.

References

External links

1954 births
Screenwriters from California
American television directors
American women film directors
American women television directors
Living people
Tisch School of the Arts alumni
Writers from New York City
Sarah Lawrence College alumni
University of Southern California faculty
American women screenwriters
Film directors from New York City
Screenwriters from New York (state)